Punta del Hidalgo is a small fishing village in the municipality of San Cristóbal de La Laguna, Tenerife, Canary Islands.

See also 
 Punta del Hidalgo Lighthouse

References 

Municipalities in Tenerife